Lebuhraya Kampung Jawa, or Kampong Java Avenue, Federal Route 3114 (formerly Penang state route P17), is an industrial federal road in Penang, Malaysia.

At most sections, the Federal Route 3114 was built under the JKR R5 road standard, with a speed limit of 90 km/h.

List of junctions

References

Malaysian Federal Roads
Roads in Penang